By-elections to the States of Jersey were held on 5 March 2014.

Background
Trevor Pitman and Shona Pitman lost their seats in January 2014 after being declared bankrupt. This resulted in a by-election, on 5 March 2014, for Deputy of St Helier No. 1 and St Helier No. 2 districts.

Results

St Helier No. 1

St Helier No. 2

References

External links
States of Jersey elections

By 2014
2014 in Jersey
2014 elections in Europe